The Jinxiang dialect is a Taihu Wu dialect, or a Northern Wu dialect, spoken in the county of Cangnan of the prefecture-level city Wenzhou. It is considered to be a Taihu Wu linguistic exclave within the mostly Min Nan-speaking part of Southern Zhejiang.

The Modern Jinxiang dialect is descended from the speech of soldiers from Northern Zhejiang who settled during the Ming dynasty due to Wokou pirate raids, during the reign of the Jiajing Emperor. These soldiers were sent to Jinxiang to protect the town from raids by the Wokou. The majority of Jinxiang natives today are descended from those soldiers who served under Qi Jiguang.

Isolated from the other Taihu Wu-speaking regions, surrounded by Min Nan-speaking areas, the Jinxiang dialect has some degree of influence from Zhenan Min. It has also some influence from Mandarin Chinese.

References

Wu Chinese